Chilca District is one of twenty-eight districts of the province Huancayo in Peru. It has a population of approximately 92,000 people.

References